Aymaran (also Jaqi or Aru) is one of the two dominant language families in the central Andes alongside Quechuan. The family consists of Aymara, widely spoken in Bolivia, and the endangered Jaqaru and Kawki languages of Peru.

Hardman (1978) proposed the name Jaqi for the family of languages (1978), Alfredo Torero Aru 'to speak', and Rodolfo Cerrón Palomino Aymaran, with two branches, Southern (or Altiplano) Aymaran and Central Aymaran (Jaqaru and Kawki). Other names for the family are Jaqui (also spelled Haki) and Aimara. 

Quechuan languages, especially those of the south, share a large amount of vocabulary with Aymara, and the languages have often been grouped together as Quechumaran. This proposal is controversial, however; the shared vocabulary may be better explained as intensive borrowing due to long-term contact.

Language contact
Jolkesky (2016) notes that there are lexical similarities with the Kechua, Kunza, Leko, Uru-Chipaya, Arawak, and Pukina language families due to contact.

Phonology

Vowels 
Aymaran languages have only three phonemic vowels , which in most varieties of Aymara and Jaqaru are distinguished by length. Length is commonly transcribed using diaereses in Aymara and length diacritics in Jaqaru.

Consonants 
Though Aymaran languages vary in terms of consonant inventories, they have several features in common. Aymara and Jaqaru both contain phonemic stops at labial, alveolar, palatal, velar and uvular points of articulation. Stops are distinguished by ejective and aspirated features. Both also contain alveolar, palatal, and velar fricatives and several central and lateral approximants.

Morphophonology 
Aymaran languages differ from Quechuan languages in that all verbal and nominal roots must end in a vowel, even in loanwords: Spanish habas ("beans") became Aymara hawasa and Jaqaru háwaša. This feature is not found in other Andean language. 

Like Quechuan languages, Aymaran languages are highly agglutinative. However, they differ in that many agglutinative suffixes trigger vowel suppression in the preceding roots. An example is the loss of final vowel in the word apa ("to take"), when it becomes ap-su ("to take out").

Family division
Aymaran consists of two or three languages:
Aymara. Southern and Central dialects divergent and sometimes considered separate languages.
Jaqaru (Haqearu, Haqaru, Haq'aru, Aru).
Kawki (Cauqui, Cachuy).

Aymara has approximately 2.2 million speakers; 1.7 million in Bolivia, 350,000 in Peru, and the rest in Chile and Argentina. Jaqaru has approximately 725 speakers in central Peru, and Kawki had 9 surviving speakers as of 2005. Kawki is little documented though its relationship with Jaqaru is quite close,. Initially, they were considered by Martha Hardman (on very limited data at the time) to be different languages, but all subsequent fieldwork and research has contradicted that and demonstrated that they are mutually intelligible but divergent dialects of a single language.

See also
 Quechuan and Aymaran spelling shift

Bibliography

 Adelaar, Willem F. H.; & Muysken, Pieter C. (2004). The languages of the Andes. Cambridge language surveys. Cambridge University Press.
 Campbell, Lyle. (1997). American Indian languages: The historical linguistics of Native America. New York: Oxford University Press. .
 Kaufman, Terrence. (1994). The native languages of South America. In C. Mosley & R. E. Asher (Eds.), Atlas of the world's languages (pp. 46–76). London: Routledge.

References

 
Agglutinative languages
Language families